Domenico D'Alberto (born 1 February 1907 in Budapest; date of death unknown) was a Hungarian professional football player. He also held Italian citizenship.

He played for 3 seasons (50 games, 12 goals) in the Serie A for A.S. Roma and A.S. Lucchese Libertas 1905.

Technical characteristics 
Mancino, physically short and very agile, was equipped with an excellent technical background (which allowed him to perform numerous assists for teammates) and a good shot.

References

Bibliography 

 Valerio Vargiu, Cagliari 90 - The history and protagonists of the most loved team on the island from 1920 to 2010 - Volume 1, Cagliari, La Guida, 2010.

1907 births
Year of death missing
Hungarian footballers
Serie A players
Cagliari Calcio players
A.S. Roma players
S.S.D. Lucchese 1905 players
Association football forwards
Footballers from Budapest